Kastabara was a town of ancient Lycia, which per the Stadiasmus Patarensis was 128 stadia from Tlos.
 
Its site is unlocated.

References

Populated places in ancient Lycia
Former populated places in Turkey